The Houston Street station was a station on the demolished IRT Third Avenue Line in Manhattan, New York City on the Bowery. It opened on September 16, 1878, and had three tracks and two island platforms, which served all three tracks on one level. This station closed on May 12, 1955, with the ending of all service on the Third Avenue El south of 149th Street.

References

External links

IRT Third Avenue Line stations
Railway stations in the United States opened in 1878
Railway stations closed in 1955
1878 establishments in New York (state)
1955 disestablishments in New York (state)
Former elevated and subway stations in Manhattan